The 1981–82 Chicago Black Hawks season was the 56th season of operation of the Chicago Black Hawks in the National Hockey League.

Offseason
During the off-season, the NHL realigned their divisions, and the Black Hawks moved from the Smythe Division to the Norris Division.  Joining Chicago in the Norris Division were the Detroit Red Wings, Minnesota North Stars, St. Louis Blues, Toronto Maple Leafs, and Winnipeg Jets, making it the only six team division in the league.

At the 1981 NHL Entry Draft, the Hawks drafted Tony Tanti with their first round draft pick.  Tanti had 81 goals and 150 points with the Oshawa Generals of the OHL in 1980-81.

Regular season
Chicago had a solid start to the season, opening with a 9-5-6 record in their first 20 games, only two points behind the Minnesota North Stars for first place in the Norris Division.  The Black Hawks struggled over the next part of the season, as they quickly fell out of contention for first place, going 14-28-4 in their next 46 games, falling into fourth place.  During the slump, head coach Keith Magnuson resigned, as Bob Pulford took over as the interim head coach for the remainder of the season.  Chicago finished the season with a 30-38-12 record, earning 72 points, which was good enough for the final playoff spot in the Norris.

Offensively, Denis Savard had a breakout season, scoring 32 goals and a club record 119 points while playing in all 80 games.  Al Secord scored a team high 44 goals, and finished with 75 points, while getting a team high 303 penalty minutes.  Tom Lysiak had another solid season, scoring 32 goals and 82 points.  On defence, Doug Wilson had an excellent season, scoring 39 goals and 85 points, while Doug Crossman emerged with 12 goals and 40 points.

In goal, Tony Esposito had the majority of playing time, going 19-25-8 with a 4.52 GAA in 52 games.  Murray Bannerman backed him up with an 11-12-4 record and a 4.17 GAA in 29 games.

Final standings

Playoffs

Chicago Black Hawks 3, Minnesota North Stars 1
The Black Hawks opened the playoffs with a best-of-five Norris Division semi-final series against the Minnesota North Stars.  The North Stars had the best record in the Norris, going 37-23-20, earning 94 points, which was 22 more than the Black Hawks.  The series opened with two games at the Met Center in Bloomington, Minnesota.  With the game tied at 2-2 at the end of regulation time, the Hawks Greg Fox emerged as the hero in overtime, scoring 3:34 into the extra period, as Chicago won the game 3-2 to take a 1-0 series lead.  Chicago goaltender Murray Bannerman made 45 saves in the victory.  In the second game, the Black Hawks, led by two goals by Tom Lysiak and 33 saves from Murray Bannerman, defeated the North Stars 5-3 to take both games in Minnesota.  The series shifted to Chicago Stadium for the next two games, and the North Stars rebounded with a 7-1 victory in the third game, as Dino Ciccarelli led the way with three goals for Minnesota.  The Black Hawks completed the upset in the fourth game, defeating the North Stars 5-2, as goaltender Tony Esposito made 31 saves for the win.

Chicago Black Hawks 4, St. Louis Blues 2
In the best-of-seven Norris Division finals, the Black Hawks faced the St. Louis Blues, who finished third in the division with a 32-40-8 record, tying Chicago with 72 points, however, St. Louis held the tie-breaker, as they won two more games during the season.  In the first round of the playoffs, the Blues defeated the second place Winnipeg Jets in four games.  The series opened with two games at The Checkerdome in St. Louis, Missouri, and in the first game, the Black Hawks took a 2-0 lead after the first period, only to have St. Louis have a 3-2 lead over two periods.  In the third period, the Hawks scored two quick goals by Denis Savard and Tom Lysiak to take a 4-3 lead, however, Joe Mullen of the Blues tied it midway through the period.  Doug Wilson then scored late in the third, pacing Chicago to a 5-4 win to open the series.  St. Louis evened the series in the second game, as Bernie Federko had a goal and assist, while goaltender Mike Liut made 26 saves in a 3-1 Blues victory.  The series shifted to Chicago Stadium for the next two games, and the Black Hawks stormed out of the game, scoring three goals in the first 3:01 to take a 3-0 lead.  Chicago had a 6-2 lead midway in the third period, however, St. Louis scored three consecutive goals before running out of time, as the Hawks hung on for a 6-5 victory, taking a 2-1 series lead.  In the fourth game, the Blues led the game 4-2 midway through the game, however, the Black Hawks would score five consecutive goals, winning the game 7-4, and taking a commanding 3-1 lead in the series.  The fifth game was back at The Checkerdome, and the two teams ended regulation time tied at 2-2.  In overtime, the Blues Bernie Federko kept St. Louis alive, scoring 3:28 into the extra period, as the Blues avoided elimination with a 3-2 victory.  The sixth game was back in Chicago, as the Black Hawks, led by Tony Esposito and his 31 saves, eliminated the Blues with a 2-0 victory.

Vancouver Canucks 4, Chicago Black Hawks 1
The Black Hawks would face the Vancouver Canucks in the best-of-seven Campbell Conference finals.  The Canucks finished the season with a 30-33-17 record, earning 77 points, five higher than the Black Hawks during the regular season.  In the playoffs, Vancouver eliminated the Calgary Flames and Los Angeles Kings to qualify for the conference finals.  The first two games were at Chicago Stadium, and in the first game, the Canucks Thomas Gradin opened the scoring at 8:02 of the first period, however, the Hawks Terry Ruskowski quickly evened the score just over two minutes later to tie the game.  Those would be the only goals scored in regulation, as the game was sent into overtime.  Neither the Black Hawks or Canucks could capitalize during the first overtime period, setting up double overtime.  In the second overtime, the Canucks Jim Nill silenced the home crowd, as Vancouver hung on for a 2-1 victory.  Canucks goaltender Richard Brodeur made 46 saves in the win, while Tony Esposito have 39 saves in the loss.  Chicago evened the series in the second game, as they were led by Denis Savard and his two goals, while Murray Bannerman had 30 saves in a 4-1 Black Hawks victory.  The series shifted to Vancouver, British Columbia for the next two games at PNE Coliseum, and in the third game, Glen Sharpley give Chicago a 1-0 lead. However, this lead would not last as Vancouver's two consecutive power play goals would prove too much for the Hawks even though they tied the game at the end of first period. The Canucks would break the tie in 2nd period by Curt Fraser and win the game 4-3 to take a 2-1 series lead. Vancouver took a 3-0 lead midway through the fourth game, however, the Black Hawks, on goals by Glen Sharpley and Denis Savard cut the Canucks lead to 3-2 early in the third.  Vancouver then scored two quick goals, and hung on for a 5-3 win, taking a 3-1 series lead back to Chicago.  In the fifth game, the Canucks jumped out to a quick 2-0 lead before the Hawks Tom Lysiak scored 5:09 into the game to cut the Canucks lead in half.  Vancouver took a 3-1 lead after the first.  After a scoreless second period, the Black Hawks cut the Canucks lead to 3-2 with an early third period goal by Grant Mulvey, however, Vancouver took control of the game, and the series, skating their way to a 6-2 victory, eliminating the Hawks.

Schedule and results

Player statistics

Regular season
Scoring

Goaltending

Playoffs
Scoring

Goaltending

Note: Pos = Position; GP = Games played; G = Goals; A = Assists; Pts = Points; +/- = plus/minus; PIM = Penalty minutes; PPG = Power-play goals; SHG = Short-handed goals; GWG = Game-winning goals
      MIN = Minutes played; W = Wins; L = Losses; T = Ties; GA = Goals-against; GAA = Goals-against average; SO = Shutouts;

Awards and records

Transactions

Draft picks
Chicago's draft picks at the 1981 NHL Entry Draft held at the Montreal Forum in Montreal, Quebec.

Farm teams

See also
1981–82 NHL season

References

 

Chicago Blackhawks seasons
Chicago Blackhawks
Chicago Blackhawks
Chicago
Chicago